Bonikro is a town in central Ivory Coast. It is a sub-prefecture of Djékanou Department in Bélier Region, Lacs District. The town is on the north bank of the river that forms the border between the Lacs and Lagunes Districts.

Bonikro was a commune until March 2012, when it became one of 1126 communes nationwide that were abolished.

In 2014, the population of the sub-prefecture of Bonikro was 6,420.

Villages
The 4 villages of the sub-prefecture of Bonikro and their population in 2014 are:
 Abouakro 2 - Groudji (1 556)
 Assékouamékro (879)
 Tollakro (1 319)
 Bonikro (2 666)

References

Sub-prefectures of Bélier
Former communes of Ivory Coast